"Country Song" is a song by South African rock band Seether. It was released on March 8, 2011 as the lead single from their fifth studio album Holding Onto Strings Better Left to Fray.

Background
According to frontman Shaun Morgan, the track's title "got its name from the swampy verse riff". On the band's official message board, Morgan explained the track's background, saying "in some ways I guess I was dealing with growing up and having to make better life choices. It's definitely not a country song, but we recorded the album in Nashville, and felt like it was a small homage to such a wonderful city."

Music video
The video alternates between a boy playing with various dolls and action figures, and the band portraying the boy's actions. A girl later appears, and both play with the toys, creating an increasingly chaotic scene for the band.

Charts

Weekly charts

Year-end charts

References

Seether songs
2011 singles
Song recordings produced by Brendan O'Brien (record producer)
Music videos directed by Roman White
2011 songs
Songs written by Shaun Morgan
Songs written by Dale Stewart
Songs written by John Humphrey (drummer)
Wind-up Records singles
Songs written by Troy McLawhorn